Henny Hiemenz (born c. 1978) is an American football coach.  He was the offensive coordinator at Concordia University Wisconsin, a position  he held since 2011.  Hiemenz was the head football coach  at Carroll University in Waukesha, Wisconsin from 2006 to 2010, compiling a record of 28–22.

References

External links
 Concordia profile
 D3football.com Hiemenz resigns after 7-3 season
 D3football.com Former Carroll coach stays in neighborhood

1970s births
Living people
American football fullbacks
Carroll Pioneers football coaches
Concordia Falcons football coaches
Illinois Wesleyan Titans football coaches
Ithaca Bombers football players
Ithaca Bombers football coaches
Utica Pioneers football coaches